USS Swallow (AM-4) was a U.S. Navy .  Swallow was laid down at New York City on 18 March 1918 by the Todd Shipyard Corp.; launched on Independence Day 1918; sponsored by Miss Sara V. Brereton; and commissioned on 8 October 1918. She served until 19 February 1938, when she ran aground at Kanaga Island.

History

North Atlantic operations 
Following commissioning, Swallow underwent minor adjustments and prepared for foreign service. On 6 April 1919, she steamed out of Boston Harbor, bound for Inverness, Scotland. There she joined the Minesweeping Detachment of the Northern Barrage. For most of the remainder of 1919. Swallow swept mines from the North Sea Mine Barrage laid by the Allied and Associated Powers during World War I.

West Coast operations 
The minesweeper returned to the United States late in 1919 and put into the navy yard at Charleston, South Carolina, for overhaul and repairs. Early in 1920, she sailed for the U.S. West Coast and then north to Bremerton, Washington. For the next 18 years, Swallow operated along the northwestern Pacific coast of North America, spending much of her time in Alaskan waters. In 1934, she became a unit of the Aleutian Islands Survey Expedition.

Swallow runs aground 
On 19 February 1938, Swallow ran aground at Kanaga Island and was stranded there. Salvage efforts soon proved impracticable and her name was struck from the Navy Directory on 5 May 1938.

Notes
Citations

References used

External links 
 
 USS Swallow
 USS Swallow (AM 4)
 uboat.net – Allied Warships – Lapwing class Minesweepers
 Shipwrecks and Groundings in the Aleutian Islands, Islands off the Alaska Peninsula, and Pribilof Islands
 

Lapwing-class minesweepers
Ships built in Brooklyn
1918 ships
World War I minesweepers of the United States
Shipwrecks in the Bering Sea
Maritime incidents in 1938